Paul Buttimer (born 2 July 1966) is an Irish boxer. He competed in the men's flyweight event at the 1992 Summer Olympics.

References

External links
 

1966 births
Living people
Irish male boxers
Olympic boxers of Ireland
Boxers at the 1992 Summer Olympics
Place of birth missing (living people)
Flyweight boxers